Rufoclanis numosae, the wavy polyptychus, is a moth of the family Sphingidae. The species was first described by Hans Daniel Johan Wallengren in 1860. It is known from dry bush and arid savanna in much of eastern and southern Africa.

The length of the forewings is 22–30 mm for males and 34–36 mm for females and the wingspan is 54–58 mm. The wings are greyish pinkish brown to light brown with an evenly curved oblique post-medial line on the forewings and numerous dark wavy lines on the hindwings. There is also a faint dark spot at the base of the forewings and a prominent reniform stigma, as well as two dark spots at the tornus of the hindwing.

Subspecies
Rufoclanis numosae numosae (Democratic Republic of the Congo, Tanzania, Namibia, Zimbabwe, north-eastern South Africa)
Rufoclanis numosae rostislavi Haxaire & Melichar, 2009 (Ethiopia)
Rufoclanis numosae subjectus (Walker, 1869) (Somalia, Kenya, Tanzania, Zambia)

References

Rufoclanis
Moths described in 1860
Moths of Africa